Brooke Olivia van Velden (born 14 October 1992) is a New Zealand politician who has been a Member of Parliament since the 2020 general election for ACT New Zealand. She has been the party's deputy leader since June 2020.

Early life and career
Van Velden has stated that she studied economics and international trade at the University of Auckland. She has worked for lobbying firm Exceltium. She practises Bikram Yoga and enjoys both knitting and tapestry in her leisure time.

Political career

Staffer and lobbyist 

Before becoming a Member of Parliament, van Velden worked as a staffer for ACT leader David Seymour. Her sole task in this role was to get Seymour's End of Life Choice Bill passed. She spent two years lobbying Members of Parliament to support it and helped draft the legislation. Van Velden said that she "made herself useful" to MPs who wanted to know more about the bill, and also approached politicians in the tunnel between the Beehive and the Bowen Street building to discuss the bill. She said that she has been called a "snake" and a "spy", and that once several MPs had shouted abuse at her.

The Bill passed and became an Act of Parliament in 2019, but with concessions. The bill faced opposition from members of the Justice Select Committee in 2018. Seymour and van Velden developed a "sponsor's report" for the bill, giving their own recommendations before the committee, including limiting assisted death only to those who were terminally ill. This compromise restricted choice but improved support. The Act also states that it only comes into effect if supported by a referendum. This referendum was held on 17 October and it passed with 65.1% support.

Member of Parliament 
Van Velden first ran for Parliament at the 2017 general election. She contested the  electorate and was placed third on ACT's party list, but was not elected.

Van Velden was selected as ACT's deputy leader in June 2020, at the age of 27, and was placed second on its party list for the 2020 general election. At the announcement of her role, leader David Seymour described her as the "future of the party". She did not win the electorate, placing fifth with 865 votes, but ACT, with 7.6% of the preliminary party vote, was entitled to ten MPs including van Velden. As Seymour was previously the party's only representative in Parliament, van Velden became one of nine new ACT Party MPs in the 53rd Parliament. In addition to being deputy leader, she is the ACT party whip and spokesperson for Health, Housing, Foreign Affairs, and Trade.

In late April 2021, van Velden submitted a motion asking the New Zealand Parliament to debate and vote on the issue of human rights abuses against the Uyghur ethnic minority community in China's Xinjiang province. In early May, the incumbent Labour Party revised the motion to raise concerns about human rights abuses in Xinjiang while deleting the term genocide, which was subsequently adopted by the New Zealand Parliament on 5 May. In response, the Chinese Embassy claimed that the motion was based on "groundless accusations" of human rights abuses against China and interfered in China's internal affairs.

On 19 May 2021, van Velden on behalf of her party opposed Green Party MP Golriz Ghahraman's motion calling for Members of Parliament to recognise the rights of Palestinians to self-determination and statehood while reaffirming the Act Party's support for a two-state solution to the Israel-Palestine conflict. Van Velden justified ACT's opposition on the basis of another Green MP Ricardo Menéndez March's tweet that said "From the river to the sea, Palestine will be free!." In response, Ghahraman contended that March was defending the rights of both Arabs and Jews to having equal rights in their homeland.

Van Velden's member’s bill, the Housing Infrastructure (GST-sharing) Bill, was selected for first reading in October 2022. If passed, it would require the Government to share half of the GST revenue of a new house with the territorial authority responsible for the district the house is built in.

Political views 
Van Velden has stated her reasons for entering politics are to reduce generational debt, improve housing affordability, and provide better mental health for all. She supported the End of Life Choice Bill based on her belief in freedom of choice. In a debate about legalising cannabis, van Velden said that she had smoked it before. She was formerly a Green Party voter but switched to supporting ACT while studying economics and international trade at the University of Auckland.

References

Living people
ACT New Zealand MPs
Members of the New Zealand House of Representatives
New Zealand list MPs
Unsuccessful candidates in the 2017 New Zealand general election
University of Auckland alumni
1992 births